Elpídio Donizetti (born in Campina Verde, Minas Gerais), is a Brazilian jurist, professor of Private Law and Procedural Law, chief judge of the Court of Appeal of Minas Gerais State (TJMG), author of various juridical works and takes part of the jurists committee responsible for writing the new procedural law code.

Jurists committee for the new procedural law code 

By the act nº. 379, of 2009, Senator José Sarney, President of the Federal Senate, created the committee, composed by the following members:
 Adroaldo Furtado Fabrício;
 Benedito Cerezzo Pereira Filho;
 Bruno Dantas;
 Elpídio Donizetti Nunes;
 Humberto Theodoro Júnior;
 Jansen Fialho de Almeida;
 José Miguel Garcia Medina;
 José Roberto dos Santos Bedaque;
 Marcus Vinicius Furtado Coelho;
 Paulo Cezar Pinheiro Carneiro; and
 Teresa Arruda Alvim Wambier.

Published works

Academic and professional background and notorious history 
Elpídio Donizetti has started working as an army cadet, math and physics teacher. While working in Banco do Brasil, began studying Law, and graduated in Pontifícia Universidade Católica de Minas Gerais (PUC-MG), where he also became postgraduate master in Procedural Law.

He has been prosecutor in Goiás and Minas Gerais states and professor in Universidade Federal de Uberlândia. Nowadays, he is professor in area of Procedural Law in post-graduation level in the Instituto Universitário Brasileiro - IUNIB and Lecturer Professor in various academic institutions in Brazil and abroad. He made lectures with emphasis in the project of the new code in Complexo de Ensino Renato Saraiva. He is founder of IED - Instituto Elpídio Donizetti and postgraduate in procedural law and private law by the Centro Universitário Newton Paiva.

In the magistrature of Minas Gerais, he has been judge in the counties of Perdizes, Frutal, Poços de Caldas, Uberlândia and Belo Horizonte. He has been election judge and has been raised to chief judge of the Court of Appeal of Minas Gerais State on 18 March 2005.

He is Director of the National School of the State Magistratures, an institute of graduating and development of the skills of the states judges.

Class leadership 
He has been president of AMAGIS - Association of Judges of Minas Gerais, for two periods (1988/1989 and 2000/2001) and president of ANAMAGES - National Association of the States Judges since its creation, in 2001, till the end of the 2010.

Published articles 
 Embargos à execução para entrega de coisa: prazo e segurança do juízo. Electronic Magazine of Aprobatum Course.
 Impugnar ou embargar? Os novos meios de oposição pelo devedor ao procedimento executivo introduzidos pela Lei nº. 11.232/2005. Electronic Magazine of Aprobatum Course.
 Inovações Tecnológicas a serviço do credor aspectos da penhora por meio eletrônico Lei nº. 11382/2006. Dialetic Magazine of Procedural Law, v. 51, p. 51, 2007.
 Da [em parte] absurda desconsideração da coisa julgada. Juridical Magazine of Laws and Letters, v. 16, p. 16, 2007.
 Quem é quem no Mandado de Segurança? As figuras do impetrante, impetrado e autoridade coatora. Juridical Magazine of Laws and Letters, v. 4, p. 4, 2007.
 Penhora On-line: inovações tecnológicas a serviço do credor. Juridical Consultant, v. 1, p. 1, 2007.
 Liquidar é preciso! Os novos aspectos do procedimento liquidatório à luz da Lei nº. 11.232/2005. Electronic Magazine of Aprobatum Course.
 Sentença: liquidação, cumprimento, e impugnação. A nova sistemática introduzida pela Lei nº. 11.232/2005. Electronic Magazine of Aprobatum Course.
 Homem público não tem de aceitar dádivas ou esmolas. Juridical Consultant, v. 1, p. 1, 2006.
 O umbigo do juiz e a mulher de César. Electronic Magazine of Aprobatum Course.
 Tempus Regit Actum! Breves considerações acerca do Direito Intertemporal ante a entrada em vigor da Lei nº. 11.232/2005. Electronic Magazine of Aprobatum Course.
 Informatização da Justiça de 1º Grau:Experiência e Perspectivas. Jurisprudence Magazine, v. 41, p. 41, 1990.
 Mandado de Segurança e Democracia: Apontamentos sobre o (Des)Cumprimento dos Objetivos do II Pacto Republicano Pela Lei 12.016/09. Temas Atuais de Direito - Studies for Celebration to the 80 Years of the Law Course in Espírito Santo Federal University. Rio de Janeiro: Lumen Iuris, p. 165 a 184, 2011.
 Normas jusfundamentais como limites à autonomia privada e critérios para a aplicação e coordenação - um estudo de caso sobre a inafastabilidade da jurisdição
 Mais uma tentativa de golpe contra o federalismo brasileiro - O CNJ quer usurpar poder das corregedorias estaduais
 Um consolo para o abandonado: usucapião do lar desfeito
 A (In)Observância dos precedentes em recursos repetitivos: automatismo e duplicação dos julgamentos nos tribunais ordinários
 A jurisprudência do STJ e a taxa média de mercado: agora os juros ficaram do jeito do que o diabo gosta
 Reflexões de um juiz cristão - sobre os meandros da Comissão do Novo CPC
 Marcha da Maconha: O Caminhar Plural pela Liberdade
 O Preenchimento da Máxima Aristotélica sobre a Igualdade: Study of the 'O conteúdo jurídico do Princípio da Igualdade, of Prof. Celso Antônio Bandeira de Mello"

Public contests 
 1st place in the contest for monitor of Criminal Law in Universidade Federal de Uberlândia (1981)
 4th place in the contest for Prosecutor in Goiás (1986)
 1st place in the contest for prosecutor in Minas Gerais (1988)
 1st place in the contest for Judge in Minas Gerais (1988)
 1st place in the contest for teacher of the Universidade Federal de Uberlândia (1989)
 8th place in the contest for Federal Prosecutor (1989)
 1st place in the contest for entering to master course of PUC-MG (2000)
 Grade 100 for the thesis O exercício da jurisdição sob o prisma da efetividade, to the PUC-MG to receive the Master title in Procedural Law (2002)
 1st place in the contest to enter the course of Electrical Engineering (1978)
 1st place in the contest for working in the National Institute of Social Security (1978)
 8th place in the contest for working in the Banco do Brasil (1979)

Honor Meritorious of Faculdade de Direito da Universidade de Lisboa 
Elpídio Donizetti was graced with the Honor of Meritorious of Faculdade de Direito da Universidade de Lisboa.He has thanked donating books to the University. PhD Maria José de Abreu, Director of that University, received the books and thanked the enrichment of the University's Library to improve the knowledge of students and teachers.

Family 
Elpídio Donizetti is married with Tatiane Albuquerque. He has two children, Flávia and Tiago, and one granddaughter, Júlia Nunes Rosado (daughter of Flávia and Walter Rosado Filho).

References

Brazilian jurists
Brazilian people of Italian descent
People from Minas Gerais
Living people
Year of birth missing (living people)